A by-election for the United Kingdom parliamentary constituency of Tiverton and Honiton was held on 23 June 2022. The vacancy was caused by the resignation on 4 May 2022 of the incumbent Member of Parliament (MP), Neil Parish of the Conservative Party, following his admission to accusations that he viewed pornography on his mobile phone in the House of Commons chamber.

The election was won by Richard Foord of the Liberal Democrats. The Conservative majority of 24,239 in the 2019 general election is thought to have been the largest majority ever overturned in a by-election. It was the party's third gain from the Conservatives since the 2019 general election, following their victory at Chesham and Amersham in June 2021, and in North Shropshire in December 2021.

The election was held on the same day as the Wakefield by-election in West Yorkshire, which the Conservatives lost to the Labour Party. This was the first time since the 1991 Kincardine and Deeside and Langbaurgh by-elections that a British government has lost two seats in by-elections on the same day.

Background

Constituency

Tiverton and Honiton lies in Devon and the constituency is primarily rural, with major settlements being the towns of Tiverton and Honiton. Other towns include Axminster, Seaton and Cullompton. In the 2016 EU referendum, 57.8% of the voters who turned out voted to leave the European Union.

The by-election was the ninth of the 2019 Parliament. The seat was said by The Guardian to be, on paper at least, one of the safest in the country for the Conservatives, with the party having held the constituency since its creation in 1997 by increasing margins, with its inaugural election in 1997 representing the closest result in the seat, with just 1,653 votes or three percentage points separating the winning Conservative candidate and the Liberal Democrat opponent.

Trigger

Parish was first elected as a Conservative MP in the 2010 general election. A female Conservative MP complained on 25 April 2022 to the party's Chief Whip about a male colleague having watched pornography on his mobile phone in the Commons chamber, without identifying the individual. This was later identified to be Parish. He was alleged to have watched pornography on two occasions in the House of Commons. Parish said the first occasion was accidental, as he discovered a pornographic website during a search related to tractors, but admitted that the second occasion had been intentional, and announced his intention to resign as an MP on 30 April 2022.

On 4 May, Parish was appointed to the position of Steward and Bailiff of the Manor of Northstead, disqualifying him from being an MP, which is a mechanism by which an MP's resignation is put into effect.

On 17 May, the writ was moved by the Chief Whip, Chris Heaton-Harris, formally triggering the by-election.

On 19 May, the acting returning officer published the notice of the election confirming the timetable with the poll taking place on Thursday 23 June 2022, the same day as the Wakefield by-election.

Campaign
Labour frontbench sources confirmed that senior Labour figures had told them the party would be "soft-pedalling" the campaign in the by-election in order to allow the Liberal Democrats an easier shot at winning. A Labour spokesperson did not deny this, but confirmed they would be standing a candidate.

The Times reported a focus group for Times Radio had found that voters in the constituency who supported the Tories in the last election were swinging towards the Liberal Democrats as they lost faith in Conservative Prime Minister Boris Johnson.

Cllr Paul Arnott, the leader of East Devon District Council, and of the East Devon Alliance Independents group on the council, announced he had joined the national Liberal Democrats party and supported them in the by-election.

On 15 June, The Guardian reported on internal polling carried out by the Liberal Democrats based on 'tens of thousands of voter contacts', which found that the Conservatives had 46% support and the Lib Dems were marginally behind at 44%. The Lib Dems said they had a 4% deficit at the same time before the North Shropshire by-election, which they won. Further internal polling by the Liberal Democrats, reported on by the i newspaper on 20 June, put the Liberal Democrats and the Conservatives neck-and-neck, with both garnering 45% of the vote. According to Daily Mirror journalist Rachel Wearmouth, internal data – not disclosed until after the polls had closed – showed the Liberal Democrats 5% ahead of the Conservatives over the weekend prior to the by-election.

The poor condition of Tiverton High School was reportedly an important issue in the campaign.

Candidates
Parish said that he might run in the by-election as an independent, stating that he had been pledged financial support. However, he ultimately did not appear on the list of candidates.

On 20 May, the Liberal Democrats announced that their candidate would be university worker Richard Foord, a retired Army major.

The Conservative Party produced an all-female shortlist for the seat, and selected Helen Hurford, the Deputy Mayor of Honiton, as their candidate on 22 May.

The Labour Party selected Liz Pole, a businesswoman and chair of the Constituency Labour Party, on 22 May. Pole previously stood for Labour in the same seat at the 2019 general election, coming second.

Results
This result was the sixth-largest swing against the governing party since 1945; in addition, the Conservative Party's 24,239-vote majority from the 2019 general election is the largest ever overturned in a by-election.

Previous result

Reactions
Liberal Democrat leader Sir Ed Davey said that the key factor in Foord's victory was "not just Partygate and the constant lies and law-breaking. It's the general sense of neglect and being taken for granted by [Boris] Johnson's Conservatives."

Political scientist Sir John Curtice partly attributed the large swing to the Liberal Democrats to tactical voting by Labour voters wishing to avoid a Conservative MP. Secretary of State for Education Nadhim Zahawi said that the new schools programme was an important reason in the by-election.

Conservative candidate Helen Hurford was ridiculed in the press for locking herself in a storage room upon her arrival at the counting venue, and refusing to speak to journalists.

See also
 Largest swings in United Kingdom by-elections

References

2022 elections in the United Kingdom
2022 in England
2020s in Devon
By-elections to the Parliament of the United Kingdom in Devon constituencies
2022
June 2022 events in the United Kingdom